The Watermen, Lightermen, Tugmen and Bargemen's Union was a trade union in the United Kingdom.

The union was formed in 1925 when the watermen and lightermen belonging to the National Amalgamated Stevedores, Lightermen, Watermen and Dockers decided to secede and form their own union. It merged with the Transport and General Workers' Union in 1971.

See also
 List of trade unions
 Transport and General Workers' Union
 TGWU amalgamations
 Labour Protection League

References
Arthur Ivor Marsh, Victoria Ryan. Historical Directory of Trade Unions, Volume 5 Ashgate Publishing, Ltd., Jan 1, 2006 pg. 437

External links
Photo of The Amalgamated Society of Watermen, Lightermen and Bargemen
Diagram of trade union family tree

Defunct trade unions of the United Kingdom
1925 establishments in the United Kingdom
Maritime trade unions
Port workers' trade unions
Transport and General Workers' Union amalgamations
Trade unions established in 1925
Trade unions disestablished in 1971
Trade unions based in London